The Governor of the Central Bank of Sri Lanka (CBSL) functions as the chief executive of the Sri Lankan central bank. The post is the ex-officio chairperson of the Monetary Board of Central Bank of Sri Lanka. Since its establishment in 1950, the CBSL has been headed by sixteen governors. The governor has two deputies and several assistant governors. The inaugural officeholder was the American John Exter who served the Government of Sri Lanka in helping found the central bank. The position is currently held by Nandalal Weerasinghe who was appointed to the office on 8 April 2022 following the resignation of Ajith Nivard Cabraal.

Privileges 
The term of office last for six years and includes serval privileges in form of allowances. This includes use of the Bank House as the official residence, transport and security provided by the CBSL. The governor is entitled to a pension. In the order of precedence, the governor is equivalent to a cabinet minister.

List of governors of the Central Bank

References

External links
 Governors of the Central Bank of Sri Lanka

 
Sri Lanka